Gao Ming (born February 19, 1982, in Qingdao) is a retired Chinese football second striker.

Professional career

Qingdao
His career at Qingdao was a big success. He started representing Qingdao Etsong in senior level matches in 2000. Along with Qu Bo, they were considered to be one of the best attacking partners in China.

Shandong Luneng
Shandong Luneng purchased Gao Ming in early 1995. The club paid 3 million RMB together with Liu Zhiyong and Qin Sheng to Qingdao Jonoon. He joined Shandong Luneng with a big expectation. However, he could not secure a position in Shandong Luneng in 2005.

Changchun Yatai
Gao Ming joined Changchun Yatai on loan in 2006.

Guangzhou
Gao Ming joined Shen Xiangfu, his coach in China Youth team in 2007 on loan again. After Guangzhou Pharmaceutical promoted into the China Super League, Gao Ming transferred to Guangzhou Pharmaceutical permanently in 2008.

References

External links
Sina Player 2008 Season

1982 births
Living people
Association football forwards
Chinese footballers
Footballers from Qingdao
Qingdao Hainiu F.C. (1990) players
Shandong Taishan F.C. players
Changchun Yatai F.C. players
Guangzhou F.C. players
Chinese Super League players
China League One players
Footballers at the 2002 Asian Games
Asian Games competitors for China